John or Jack Kershaw may refer to:

 Jack Kershaw (1913–2010), U.S. attorney
 Jack Kershaw (footballer) (active 1919–1928), English-born player moved to America
 John Kershaw (American politician) (1765–1829), U.S. Representative from South Carolina.
 John Kershaw (cricketer) (1854–1903), played for England
 John Kershaw (entomologist) (1871–1959), British entomologist who worked in South China
 John Kershaw (writer) (active 1964–1994), British screenwriter and script editor
 John Anthony Kershaw (1915–2008), British Conservative Party Member of Parliament